Patrick Stevens Henry (February 15, 1861December 28, 1933) was a U.S. Representative from Mississippi, nephew of Patrick Henry (1843-1930).

Born near Helena, Arkansas, Henry moved with his parents to Vicksburg, Mississippi, in 1865.
He attended the public schools and was graduated from the University of Mississippi, Oxford, Mississippi. He attended the United States Military Academy. He studied law, was admitted to the bar in 1882, and commenced practice in Vicksburg, Mississippi.

Henry served as city attorney 1884–1888, and  served as member of the State senate from 1888 until he resigned to become district attorney in 1890. He served as district attorney for the ninth judicial district 1890–1900. In 1896 he was a delegate to the Democratic National Convention.
He was appointed circuit judge of the ninth judicial district in 1900 and served until 1901, when he resigned, having been elected as a Democrat to the Fifty-seventh Congress (March 4, 1901 – March 3, 1903). He was an unsuccessful candidate for renomination in 1902.

He resumed the practice of law in Vicksburg, Mississippi, until his death there on December 28, 1933.
He was interred in Cedar Hill Cemetery.

References

1861 births
1933 deaths
United States Military Academy alumni
Democratic Party Mississippi state senators
Mississippi state court judges
Democratic Party members of the United States House of Representatives from Mississippi
Politicians from Vicksburg, Mississippi